Isaías Medina Angarita  (6 July 1897 – 15 September 1953) was a Venezuelan military and political leader, the president of Venezuela from 1941 until 1945, during World War II. He followed the path of his predecessor Eleazar López Contreras, and ruled the country's democratic transition process.

Career 
Medina was born in San Cristóbal, Venezuela, and graduated from the Military academy of Venezuela in 1914. He served as War Minister from 1936 to 1941 under López Contreras. In 1943, he founded the Venezuelan Democratic Party.  Medina Angarita was the first Venezuelan president who traveled abroad (in active office). First, in 1943 to the Bolivarian countries, Colombia, Ecuador, Peru, Bolivia and Panama, and in January 1944, the United States invited by Franklin Delano Roosevelt. The visit marked a milestone in the Venezuelan-US relations. Besides being the first time a Venezuelan president (in office) visited the United States, the time was made the journey was understood as an expression of the alliance of Venezuela with the Allies that fought the Axis. During the administration of Medina, Venezuela establishes relations with China in 1943 and the Soviet Union in 1945. Some in the Army considered his presidential regime too liberal while other political enemies accused him of being too conservative, and both sides were involved in a coup to remove him from power on 18 October 1945. Medina died, aged 56, in Caracas.

Medina's cabinet (1941-1945)

Personal life
Isaías Medina Angarita was married to Irma Felizola, who served as First Lady of Venezuela from 1941–1945.

See also 

Presidents of Venezuela
List of Venezuelans

References 

  Isaías Medina Angarita — Venezuelatuya.com
  Isaías Medina Angarita

Presidents of Venezuela
World War II political leaders
Venezuelan generals
Venezuelan soldiers
People from San Cristóbal, Táchira
1897 births
1953 deaths
Venezuelan Democratic Party politicians
Venezuelan people of Spanish descent
Leaders ousted by a coup